Nastik is a 1983 Indian Hindi-language action drama film produced by Vinod Doshi and directed by Pramod Chakravorty. The film stars Amitabh Bachchan, Hema Malini, Pran, Deven Verma, Sarika, Amjad Khan, Aruna Irani, Madan Puri, Bhagwan Dada, Nalini Jaywant, Rita Bhaduri, Lalita Pawar, Bob Christo and Tom Alter. The soundtrack was scored and composed by Kalyanji Anandji and the songs were written by Anand Bakshi. It was the last film to pair Bachchan and Malini before they made a comeback 20 years later in Baghban (2003).

Plot 
Shankar's (Amitabh Bachchan) father, who is a village temple priest is murdered by Tiger (Amjad Khan). His mother and sister are torched in their house. After his father, mother and sister are killed, Shankar decides to bring justice by himself and goes to the palace of Tiger. Instead of killing Tiger, Shankar blinds him. Shankar blames God for doing nothing and grows up as a Nastik (atheist). Shankar flees to the city and becomes a thief. He joins forces with Balbir (Pran) and Gauri (Hema Malini). At one time, he is shot by Tiger for stealing his goods. In an attempt to hide, he finds his mother, who he thought was dead in the fire. In a rude awakening, he decides to stop stealing and join with his long lost family. Incidentally, Balbir saves Shankar's sister Shanti (Rita Bhaduri), who is chased by Tiger's men when she goes outside to bring medicine for her mother. Shankar reunites with his long lost mother and sister. Shankar finds out from his sister that the enemy who he thought had killed, is actually alive. He decides to finish him off once and for all.

Cast 

Amitabh Bachchan as Shankar
Hema Malini as Gauri
Raju Shrestha as adolescent Shankar
Sarika as Mala (Tiger's sister)
Pran as Balbir
Amjad Khan as Tiger
Kamal Kapoor as Seth Ghanshyamdas
Nalini Jaywant as Shankar's mother
Bharat Bhushan as Pujari (Shankar's Father)
Deven Verma as Gayaprasad
Jayshree T. as Laxmi (Gayaprasad's wife)
Rita Bhaduri as Shanti (Shankar's sister)
Viju Khote as Munim Ji
Lalita Pawar
Kavita Kiran as Balbir Sister
Tom Alter as Mr.John
Madan Puri as Ganga Ram ( Sub Inspector )

Soundtrack
Lyrics: Anand Bakshi

Sources

External links 
 

1983 films
1980s Hindi-language films
1980s action drama films
Indian action drama films
Films scored by Kalyanji Anandji
Films directed by Pramod Chakravorty
1983 drama films